David Edward Campbell (born 1971) is a Canadian political scientist and is Packey J. Dee Professor of American Democracy at the University of Notre Dame and the founding director of the Rooney Center for the Study of American Democracy.

Early life and education
Born November 29, 1971, Campbell was born and raised in the Canadian city of Medicine Hat, Alberta. He received a Bachelor of Arts degree in political science from Brigham Young University and Master of Arts and Doctor of Philosophy degrees in political science from Harvard University. His doctoral advisors were Robert D. Putnam and Paul E. Peterson. Campbell is married with two children.

Politics and religion
Campbell writes extensively about politics, religion, Mormonism, and civic engagement and is often quoted in the media on these topics. He has co-authored the books Secular Surge: A New Fault Line in American Politics with Geoffrey C. Layman and John C. Green; American Grace: How Religion Divides and Unites Us with Robert D. Putnam; and Seeking the Promised Land Mormons and American Politics with Quin Monson and John C. Green. He is also the author of Why We Vote: How Communities Shape our Civic Lives.

Campbell has written about how the rise of secularism in the United States is a direct consequence of a backlash against the close ties between the religious right and the Republican Party.  As he summarized his research in an interview, "I would say to churches, on both the left and the right, that if you want to bring people back to the pews, you want to stay out of politics."

Books
 Secular Surge: A New Fault Line in American Politics (with John C. Green and Geoffrey C. Layman) Cambridge University Press, December 2020.  
 Seeking the Promised Land: Mormons and American Politics (with John C. Green and J. Quin Monson) Cambridge University Press, 2014.  
 American Grace: How Religion Divides and Unites Us (with Robert D. Putnam) Simon & Schuster, 2010.  
 2011 Woodrow Wilson Foundation Book Award
 Why We Vote: How Schools and Communities Shape Our Civic Life Princeton University Press, 2008.  

Edited volumes:
 Making Civics Count: Citizenship Education for a New Generation (with Meira Levinson, and Frederick M. Hess) Harvard Education Press, 2012.  
 A Matter of Faith: Religion in the 2004 Presidential Election Brookings Institution Press, 2007.  
 Charters, Vouchers, and Public Education (with Paul E. Peterson) Brookings Institution Press, 2001.

References

External links
 
 Notre Dame university profile
 Mormonism and Politics: Historical and Contemporary Issues
 American Grace official website

1971 births
Brigham Young University alumni
Canadian expatriates in the United States
Canadian Latter Day Saint writers
Canadian political scientists
Canadian religion academics
Christianity and politics in the United States
Harvard Graduate School of Arts and Sciences alumni
Living people
Mormon studies scholars
People from Medicine Hat
Political science in the United States
University of Notre Dame faculty
Writers from Alberta